The Patent Act, 2003 is a law governing the granting and protections of patents in Ghana. It replaced the Patent Act of 1992.

References

External links 
 Ghana: Patent Act, 2003 (Act 657) at WIPO
Ghanaian intellectual property law
Presidency of John Kufuor